phpWebLog is a blog and content management system written in PHP.  Some of its features include moderated story submissions, integrated content management system, multiple themes and language support, user-friendly administration interface, story importing / exporting, expandable links manager, threaded comments system, and more.

History
phpWebLog was originally started in 1998 as a way to serve dynamic content for a small music review site called "The Friends of Incentive".  phpWeblog was one of the first open-source blogging systems and was the basis for a few forks, the more prominent being Geeklog and KorWebLog.  phpWebLog was released under the GPL software license.

References and external links

phpWebLog project home on SourceForge
phpWebLog project home on FreshMeat

Content management systems